The draw for the 2018 FIFA World Cup took place on 1 December 2017 at the State Kremlin Palace in Moscow, Russia. It determined the group in which each of the 32 qualified national teams would play in at the start of the tournament. The teams were divided into four pots of eight, with one team selected from each pot to form a group.

Unlike previous editions of the World Cup, all pots were determined by each national team's October 2017 FIFA World Ranking, with Pot 1 containing the highest-ranked teams, Pot 2 containing the next highest-ranked teams, and so on until Pot 4, containing the lowest ranked teams; in previous editions only one pot containing the highest-ranked teams was determined by rank, with the other three pots determined by continental confederation. The hosts continued to be placed in Pot 1 and treated as a seeded team, and therefore Pot 1 consisted of hosts Russia and the seven highest-ranked teams that qualified for the tournament.

The draw sequence started with pot 1 and ended with pot 4.

As with previous editions, no group had more than one team from any continental confederation except for UEFA, which had at least one, but no more than two in a group.

Seeding
Teams were seeded using the October 2017 FIFA World Rankings (shown in parentheses), which were published on 16 October 2017.

Notes
 H : Hosts

Final draw

References

Seeding
FIFA World Cup seeding